Kista Peak is a  mountain summit located in the North Saskatchewan River valley of Alberta, Canada. Kista Peak is part of the Ram Range, a sub-range of the Canadian Rockies. Its nearest higher peak is Mount Mumford,  to the south. Precipitation runoff from Kista Peak drains west into Abraham Lake, or east into Kiska Creek.


Geology

Kista Peak is composed of sedimentary rock laid down from the Precambrian to Jurassic periods that was pushed east and over the top of younger rock during the Laramide orogeny.

Climate

Based on the Köppen climate classification, Kista Peak is located in a subarctic climate with cold, snowy winters, and mild summers.

See also

List of mountains of Canada
Alberta's Rockies

References

Gallery

Two-thousanders of Alberta
Alberta's Rockies